When Nuggets Glistened: A Cooee from '54 is a novel by Arthur Wright set during the Australian Gold Rush of 1854.

References

External links
When Nuggets Glistened at AustLit
When Nuggets Glistened at National Archives of Australia
Serialisation of story at World New in 1917 – 20 Oct (first installment), 27 Oct, 3 Nov, 10 Nov, 24 Nov, 1 Dec, 8 Dec, 15 Dec, 29 Dec

1918 Australian novels
Australian historical novels
Novels set in the 1850s
Novels set in Victoria (Australia)